"New Freezer" is a song by American rapper Rich the Kid featuring fellow American rapper Kendrick Lamar, released on September 26. 2017. Written alongside producer Ben Jayne, it was released as the lead single from Rich the Kid's debut album The World Is Yours (2018). The original version featured A$AP Ferg and MadeinTYO. A$AP Ferg revealed in 2019 that Lamar agreed to feature on the track on the condition that he would be the only feature.

Background
The song's demo surfaced online in September 2017, shortly before the final version with Kendrick Lamar was released. Rapper A$AP Ferg who was originally featured on the song was later excluded, and he revealed in August 2019 that Lamar insisted on being the only feature on the song if it were to be released. Ferg said, however, he was happy the song catapulted Rich the Kid's career in the end.

Critical reception
Natalie Maher of Billboard called the song a "head-snapping cut".

Live performances
The artists performed the song live at the 2018 Brit Awards, with Lamar standing on top of a glass box as Rich smashed a luxury car in front of the crowd.

Remixes
Lil Wayne and Gudda Gudda recorded a remix of the song for Wayne's mixtape Dedication 6.

Charts

Weekly charts

Year-end charts

Certifications

Release history

References

External links
 

2017 singles
2017 songs
Rich the Kid songs
Kendrick Lamar songs
Songs written by Rich the Kid
Songs written by Kendrick Lamar
Music videos directed by Dave Free
Interscope Records singles